SS Mutlah was a 3,393-ton steamship built for the Nourse Line in 1907 by Charles Connell & Company Limited, Glasgow, Scotland. She disappeared along with her crew of 40 after sending a distress call on 29 December 1923 while sailing in the Mediterranean Sea.  The ship had triple expansion, 425-nhp (317-kW) steam engines driving a single screw.

Like other Nourse Line ships, she had primarily been used for the transport of Indian indentured labourers to the colonies. Details of some of these voyages are as follows:

Mutlah caught fire at Naples, Italy, and sank on 24 March 1920. She was refloated, repaired, and returned to service.

In 1921 she was purchased by Soc di Nav Latina, Naples, Italy. In 1923 she was purchased by Occidens Soc. Anon di Nav, Genoa, Italy.

She then disappeared without trace. She is presumed to have foundered with the loss of all hands.

See also 
 Indian Indenture Ships to Fiji
 Indian indenture system

References

External links 
 
 
 

History of Suriname
Indian indentureship in Trinidad and Tobago
Indian indenture ships to Fiji
Victorian-era passenger ships of the United Kingdom
1907 ships
Ships built on the River Clyde
Maritime incidents in 1920
Maritime incidents in 1923
Missing ships
Ships lost with all hands
Shipwrecks in the Mediterranean Sea
Ships of the Nourse Line